Windows-1270 is a code page used under Microsoft Windows to write Sami languages and the Finnish Kalo language.

Character set
The following table shows Windows-1270. Each character is shown with its Unicode equivalent.

References

External links

Windows code pages